Yvan Freedman (born 2 August 1926) was a Belgian field hockey player. He competed in the men's tournament at the 1956 Summer Olympics.

References

External links
 

1926 births
Possibly living people
Belgian male field hockey players
Olympic field hockey players of Belgium
Field hockey players at the 1956 Summer Olympics
Sportspeople from Antwerp